Carragana is a hamlet in Porcupine Rural Municipality No. 395, Saskatchewan, Canada. The community had a population of 30 in 2001. It previously held the status of village until March 25, 1998. The hamlet is located 12 km east of the Town of Porcupine Plain at the intersection of highway 23 & highway 678.

Demographics

Prior to March 25, 1998, Carragana was incorporated as a village, and was restructured as a hamlet under the jurisdiction of the Rural municipality of Porcupine that date.

See also

List of communities in Saskatchewan
Hamlets of Saskatchewan

References

Porcupine No. 395, Saskatchewan
Former villages in Saskatchewan
Unincorporated communities in Saskatchewan
Populated places disestablished in 1998